Centre for Appropriate Technology may refer to:

Centre for Appropriate Technology (Australia)
El Centro Integrado de Technologia Appropriada (CITA) (Cuba)

See also
 Centre for Alternative Technology